Chirocephalus pelagonicus is a species of crustaceans in the family Chirocephalidae. It is endemic to North Macedonia.

References 

Anostraca
Freshwater crustaceans of Europe
Endemic arthropods of North Macedonia
Taxonomy articles created by Polbot
Crustaceans described in 1986